This is a table of notable computer programs implementing molecular mechanics force fields.

See also
Force field (chemistry)
List of software for Monte Carlo molecular modeling
Molecular mechanics
Molecular design software
Molecule editor
Comparison of software for molecular mechanics modeling
Molecular modeling on GPU

References

Force fields
Molecular modelling
Software comparisons